Under the Skin is the debut album of Ice, released in 1993 through Pathological Records.

Track listing

Accolades

Personnel 
Ice
Justin Broadrick – guitar, drum machine
Dave Cochrane – bass guitar
John Jobbagy – drums
Kevin Martin – tenor saxophone, sampler, vocals, production
Production and additional personnel
Alex Buess – tenor saxophone on "Juggernaut Kiss" and "Survival of the Fattest" and engineering on all tracks
Tony Cousins – mastering
Jon Wakelin – recording

References

External links 
 

1993 debut albums
Ice (band) albums